Octomeria rohrii is a species of orchid endemic to Brazil (Santa Catarina).

References

External links 

rohrii
Endemic orchids of Brazil
Flora of Santa Catarina (state)